Kullfi Kumarr Bajewala is an Indian musical television series created and directed by Gul Khan and Nilanjana Purkasthya. It is a remake version of Potol Kumar Gaanwala. The story of this show follows the journey of a young singing prodigy Kullfi, who sets out to find her father, Sikandar Singh Gill.

The series premiered on 19 March 2018, on StarPlus. The first season is started from premiered day and still running on StarPlus. On 3 August 2018, the show has completed 100 episodes and achieving their first goal.

Series overview

Episodes

Season 1

References

External links
 Kullfi Kumarr Bajewala Streaming on Hotstar
 
 
 Kullfi Kumarr Bajewala on TV Time

Hindi serials episodes articles